Tracey Dorow is the head women's basketball coach for Valparaiso University. In 2016, she received a contract extension through 2017–18. Prior to joining the Beacons, she coached the Ferris State Bulldogs women's basketball team for 14 years. She also served as an assistant coach at Lake Michigan Community College and as a graduate assistant at the University of Indianapolis.

Dorow played at Illinois State University and Northern Michigan University. She received her bachelor's degree at Western Michigan University and her master's degree at the University of Indianapolis.

References

Living people
Illinois State Redbirds women's basketball players
Northern Michigan University alumni
University of Indianapolis alumni
Valparaiso Beacons women's basketball coaches
Western Michigan University alumni
Year of birth missing (living people)